The 2020 UEFA European Under-17 Championship qualifying competition was a men's under-17 football competition that was originally to determine the 15 teams joining the automatically qualified hosts Estonia in the 2020 UEFA European Under-17 Championship final tournament, before being cancelled due to the COVID-19 pandemic.

Apart from Estonia, all remaining 54 UEFA member national teams entered the qualifying competition. Players born on or after 1 January 2003 are eligible to participate.

Format
The qualifying competition consists of two rounds:
Qualifying round: Apart from Spain and England, which receive byes to the elite round as the teams with the highest seeding coefficient, the remaining 52 teams are drawn into 13 groups of four teams. Each group is played in single round-robin format at one of the teams selected as hosts after the draw. The 13 group winners, the 13 runners-up, and the four third-placed teams with the best record against the first and second-placed teams in their group advance to the elite round.
Elite round: The 32 teams are drawn into eight groups of four teams. Each group is played in single round-robin format at one of the teams selected as hosts after the draw. The eight group winners and the seven runners-up with the best record against all teams in their group qualify for the final tournament.

The schedule of each group is as follows, with two rest days between each matchday (Regulations Article 20.04):

Tiebreakers
In the qualifying round and elite round, teams are ranked according to points (3 points for a win, 1 point for a draw, 0 points for a loss), and if tied on points, the following tiebreaking criteria are applied, in the order given, to determine the rankings (Regulations Articles 14.01 and 14.02):
Points in head-to-head matches among tied teams;
Goal difference in head-to-head matches among tied teams;
Goals scored in head-to-head matches among tied teams;
If more than two teams are tied, and after applying all head-to-head criteria above, a subset of teams are still tied, all head-to-head criteria above are reapplied exclusively to this subset of teams;
Goal difference in all group matches;
Goals scored in all group matches;
Penalty shoot-out if only two teams have the same number of points, and they met in the last round of the group and are tied after applying all criteria above (not used if more than two teams have the same number of points, or if their rankings are not relevant for qualification for the next stage);
Disciplinary points (red card = 3 points, yellow card = 1 point, expulsion for two yellow cards in one match = 3 points);
UEFA coefficient ranking for the qualifying round draw;
Drawing of lots.

To determine the four best third-placed teams from the qualifying round, the results against the teams in fourth place are discarded. To determine the seven best runners-up from the elite round, all results are considered. The following criteria are applied (Regulations Articles 15.01, 15.02 and 15.03):
Points;
Goal difference;
Goals scored;
Disciplinary points (total 3 matches);
UEFA coefficient ranking for the qualifying round draw;
Drawing of lots.

Qualifying round

Draw
The draw for the qualifying round was held on 6 December 2018, 09:00 CET (UTC+1), at the UEFA headquarters in Nyon, Switzerland.

The teams were seeded according to their coefficient ranking, calculated based on the following:
2015 UEFA European Under-17 Championship final tournament and qualifying competition (qualifying round and elite round)
2016 UEFA European Under-17 Championship final tournament and qualifying competition (qualifying round and elite round)
2017 UEFA European Under-17 Championship final tournament and qualifying competition (qualifying round and elite round)
2018 UEFA European Under-17 Championship final tournament and qualifying competition (qualifying round and elite round)

Each group contained one team from Pot A, one team from Pot B, one team from Pot C, and one team from Pot D. Based on the decisions taken by the UEFA Emergency Panel, the following pairs of teams could not be drawn in the same group: Russia and Ukraine, Serbia and Kosovo, Bosnia and Herzegovina and Kosovo, Azerbaijan and Armenia.

Notes
Teams marked in bold have qualified for the final tournament.

Groups
The qualifying round must be played by 19 November 2019.

Times up to 26 October 2019 are CEST (UTC+2), thereafter times are CET (UTC+1), as listed by UEFA (local times, if different, are in parentheses).

Group 1

Group 2

Group 3

Group 4

Group 5

Group 6

Group 7

Group 8

Group 9

Group 10

Group 11

Group 12

Group 13

Ranking of third-placed teams
To determine the four best third-placed teams from the qualifying round which advance to the elite round, only the results of the third-placed teams against the first and second-placed teams in their group are taken into account.

Elite round

Draw
The draw for the elite round was held on 3 December 2019, 12:45 CET (UTC+1), at the UEFA headquarters in Nyon, Switzerland.

The teams were seeded according to their results in the qualifying round. Spain and England, which received byes to the elite round, were automatically seeded into Pot A. Each group contained one team from Pot A, one team from Pot B, one team from Pot C, and one team from Pot D. Winners and runners-up from the same qualifying round group could not be drawn in the same group, but the best third-placed teams could be drawn in the same group as winners or runners-up from the same qualifying round group. Based on the decisions taken by the UEFA Emergency Panel, Russia and Ukraine could not be drawn in the same group.

Groups
The elite round was originally scheduled to be played between 25 and 31 March 2020. On 12 March 2020, UEFA announced that the elite round had been postponed due to the COVID-19 pandemic. UEFA announced on 1 April 2020 that the tournament had been cancelled.

Times up to 28 March 2020 are CET (UTC+1), thereafter times are CEST (UTC+2), as listed by UEFA (local times, if different, are in parentheses).

Group 1

Group 2

Group 3

Group 4

Group 5

Group 6

Group 7

Group 8

Ranking of second-placed teams
To determine the seven best second-placed teams from the elite round which qualify for the final tournament, all results are taken into account (Regulations Article 15.02). This is different from the elite round of previous qualifying tournaments where the results against the teams in fourth place are discarded.

Qualified teams
The following 16 teams qualify for the final tournament.

1 Bold indicates champions for that year. Italic indicates hosts for that year.

Goalscorers
In the qualifying round,

References

External links

Under-17 Matches: 2020 Qualifying, UEFA.com

Qualification
2020
2019 in youth association football
2020 in youth association football
September 2019 sports events in Europe
October 2019 sports events in Europe
November 2019 sports events in Europe
Association football events curtailed due to the COVID-19 pandemic